Squirrell is a surname. Notable people with the surname include:
 Leonard Squirrell (1893–1979), English artist
 Trevor Squirrell, American politician from Vermont

English-language surnames